The St. Petersburg Department of Steklov Institute of Mathematics of the Russian Academy of Sciences (abbreviated ПОМИ (POMI) for "Петербургское отделение Математического института", Petersburg Department of the Mathematical Institute) is a mathematical research institute in St. Petersburg, part of the Russian Academy of Sciences. Until 1992 it was known as Leningrad Department of Steklov Institute of Mathematics of the USSR Academy of Sciences (ЛОМИ, LOMI).

The name of the institution is a historical tradition and since 1995 it has no subordination to the Steklov Institute of Mathematics.

The institute was established in 1940 as a department of the Steklov Institute and is named after Vladimir Andreevich Steklov, a Soviet/Russian mathematician, mechanician and physicist.

Directors 

 V. A. Tartakovskii (1940-1941)
 Andrey Markov, Jr. (1942-1953)
 Nikolai Erugin (1953-1957)
 Georgii Petrashen' (1957-1976)
 Ludvig Faddeev (1976-2000)
 Ildar Abdulovich Ibragimov (2000-2006)
 Sergei Kislyakov (2007-)

Notable researchers 
 Aleksandr Danilovich Aleksandrov
 Yuri Burago
 Nikolai Durov 
 Dmitry Konstantinovich Faddeev
 Vera Faddeeva 
 Fedor Fomin
 Leonid Kantorovich
 Vladimir Korepin
 Olga Ladyzhenskaya
 Yuri Linnik
 Yuri Matiyasevich
 Grigori Perelman worked at this institution when he proved the Poincaré conjecture.
 Nicolai Reshetikhin
 Nikolai Aleksandrovich Shanin
 Samson Shatashvili
 Andrei Suslin
 Leon Takhtajan
 Anatoly Vershik 
 Alexander Volberg
 Oleg Viro
 Victor Zalgaller

References

External links
 Institute's website

Mathematical institutes
Buildings and structures in Saint Petersburg
Institutes of the Russian Academy of Sciences
Universities and institutes established in the Soviet Union
Research institutes in the Soviet Union